Eleanor Needham may refer to:

Eleanor Needham (17th century), mistress of James Scott, 1st Duke of Monmouth and daughter of Robert Needham
Eleanor Needham (17th century), wife of English MP Robert Needham
Ellen Needham (1834–1900), Anglo-Irish author and artist